The Third pandemic may refer to:

Third plague pandemic 1855–1960
Third cholera pandemic 1846–1860
The Third Pandemic, a 1996 science fiction novel by Pierre Ouellette

See also
Pandemic (disambiguation)
First pandemic (disambiguation)
Second pandemic (disambiguation)
Fourth pandemic
Fifth pandemic
Sixth pandemic
Seventh pandemic